Hagood Clarke, III (born June 14, 1942) is an American former college and professional football player who was a defensive back in the American Football League (AFL) for five seasons during the 1960s.  Clarke played college football for the University of Florida, and thereafter, he played professionally for the Buffalo Bills of the AFL.

Early life 

Clarke was born in Atlanta, Georgia in 1942.  For his high school education, he attended Baylor School in Chattanooga, Tennessee, where he played high school football for the Baylor School Tigers.

College career 

Clarke attended the University of Florida in Gainesville, Florida, where he was a walk-on player for coach Ray Graves' Florida Gators football team from 1961 to 1963.  Clarke played both ways for the Gators, playing halfback on offense and safety on defense.  Memorably, he caught a nineteen-yard touchdown pass to clinch the Gators' 17–7 upset win over the ninth-ranked Penn State Nittany Lions in the 1962 Gator Bowl, intercepted a third-quarter Joe Namath pass to help preserve a 10–6 upset of the third-ranked Alabama Crimson Tide in Tuscaloosa in 1963, and ran for a seventy-yard touchdown to provide the margin of victory in the Gators' 27–21 win over the Miami Hurricanes later that same season.  He was also the Gators' principal punter in 1962, with forty-six punts for 1,884 yards (and average of 41.0 yards per kick).  Clarke led the Gators in punt return yardage in 1961 and 1962, and was the recipient of the Gators' Fergie Ferguson Award, recognizing the "senior football player who displays outstanding leadership, courage and character," in 1963.

Clarke graduated from the University of Florida with a bachelor's degree in business administration in 1965, and was later inducted into the University of Florida Athletic Hall of Fame as a "Gator Great."

Professional career 

Clarke was selected by the San Francisco 49ers of the National Football League (NFL) in the seventh round (85th pick overall) of the 1964 NFL Draft, but signed with coach Lou Saban's Buffalo Bills of the alternative AFL, and played his entire five-year career as a safety and punt returner for the Bills from 1964 to 1968.  In his first three seasons with the Bills, the team won the AFL Championship Game in 1964 and 1965, and lost it in 1966.  Statistically, Clarke's best season was 1965, when he had seven interceptions and played in the AFL All-Star Game.  He also was an All-AFL 2nd team selection in 1966, when he had five interceptions, including an interception of a George Blanda pass followed by a 66-yard return for a touchdown in the final twenty-seven seconds to beat the Houston Oilers, 27–20.  In 1968, his final season with the Bills, Clarke had an 82-yard punt return for a touchdown against the New York Jets.

Clark appeared in sixty-seven games in his five-season AFL career, and compiled twelve interceptions for 178 interception return yards and a touchdown.  He also tallied sixty-five career punt returns for 583 yards and two touchdowns.

Life after football 

Clarke is a financial consultant in Fort Lauderdale, Florida.

See also 

 Florida Gators football, 1960–69
 List of American Football League players
 List of Buffalo Bills players
 List of Florida Gators in the NFL Draft
 List of University of Florida alumni
 List of University of Florida Athletic Hall of Fame members

References

Bibliography 
 Carlson, Norm, University of Florida Football Vault: The History of the Florida Gators, Whitman Publishing, LLC, Atlanta, Georgia (2007).  .
 Golenbock, Peter, Go Gators!  An Oral History of Florida's Pursuit of Gridiron Glory, Legends Publishing, LLC, St. Petersburg, Florida (2002).  .
 Hairston, Jack, Tales from the Gator Swamp: A Collection of the Greatest Gator Stories Ever Told, Sports Publishing, LLC, Champaign, Illinois (2002).  .
 McCarthy, Kevin M.,  Fightin' Gators: A History of University of Florida Football, Arcadia Publishing, Mount Pleasant, South Carolina (2000).  .
 McEwen, Tom, The Gators: A Story of Florida Football, The Strode Publishers, Huntsville, Alabama (1974).  .
 Nash, Noel, ed., The Gainesville Sun Presents The Greatest Moments in Florida Gators Football, Sports Publishing, Inc., Champaign, Illinois (1998).  .

1942 births
Living people
American football halfbacks
American Football League All-Star players
American Football League players
American football safeties
Buffalo Bills players
Florida Gators football players
Players of American football from Atlanta